Høgeloft is a mountain on the border between the municipalities of Lærdal (in Vestland county) and Hemsedal (in Viken county), Norway. Høgeloft one of the mountains in the Hemsedal Top 20 group.

References

Mountains of Viken
Mountains of Vestland
Lærdal
Hemsedal